The 2007 Team Long Track World Championship was the first annual FIM Team Long Track World Championship.  The final took place on 1 September 2007 in Morizès, France. The championship was won by Germany who beat Great Britain in a final heat. Host team France finished third.

Results
  Morizès "Piste du Parc Municipal" (Length: 520 m)
 1 September 2007 (21:00 UTC+1)

Heat details

See also
 2007 Individual Long Track World Championship
 2007 Speedway World Cup

References

External links

Team Long Track World Championship
Team Long Track World Championship, 2007
Longtrack